meem (meem م) is the retail banking arm of Gulf International Bank B.S.C. (GIB), offering retail banking services to Bahraini and Saudi customers. It is intended to target the technophile customer base by offering Sharia-compliant, non-traditional banking services licensed by the Saudi Arabian Monetary Agency.

meem is a registered trademark and independent brand using online and mobile banking as the primary platforms of banking. Upon opening an account, all services can be carried out electronically. Meem has stores in Bahrain Bay (Manama), Riyadh, Jeddah and Al Dhahran and provides services such as completing the account opening process, cash withdrawals, deposits and transfers, and account maintenance.

meem was created after engaging with a large target customer base using various social media channels over three years, gaining insight into users' needs and preferences.

GIB is owned by the six GCC governments, with the Public Investment Fund of Saudi Arabia holding a majority stake (97.2 per cent). The Bank is chaired by H.E. Jammaz bin Abdullah Al-Suhaim.

‘meem م’ Locations 

Currently, ‘meem م’ has three main stores in Dhahran and Riyadh.

Store Locations - Eastern Province
 Dhahran – Dammam/Khobar Express Highway (Main) 
 Khobar – AlRashid Mall  
 Khobar – eXtra Store  
 Dammam – eXtra Store

Store Locations - Central Region
 Riyadh, Granada – GOSI Complex (Main) 
Riyadh - Al Nakheel Mall (Map 24.7685,46.716473)
 Riyadh – Panorama Mall  
 Riyadh – Sahafa eXtra Store  
 Riyadh – Wurood eXtra Store

Store Locations - Mecca Region
 Jeddah – Prince Sultan Rd. (Main)
 Jeddah – Old Airport Road eXtra Store 
 Jeddah – Red Sea Mall
 Jeddah – Prince Sultan eXtra
 Jeddah — Aziz Mall prince majid road

External links
 Official Website

References 

Banks of Saudi Arabia